Cadpick, a digital media market-place for 3D models, 2D blueprints and print-ready models,  is used in a wide variety of industries, including but not limited to architecture, computer graphics games, manufacturing, augmented reality and much more. The Cadpick online platform allows 3D modelers, artists and design studios to upload their 3D assets for sale or share them for free.

E-commerce and Blog Service
3D modelers, artists and design studios can upload their products detailing such information like file name, category, price, files, texture maps and renders. The product price is solely at the discretion of the seller.
Anonymous buyer system is supported at Cadpick which allows users to either purchase or download 3D models without registration. Buyers can also contact sellers for questions or comment before purchase of a 3D asset through the ‘Question to vendor’ feature.

Cadpick also has a blog called the Jobs board where custom 3D model requests by buyers are posted by site administrators in order to receive bids from seller artists. Through the Cadpick blog, users can also engage each other through forum discussions and upload and browse tutorials and other educational content in the General Topics.
Downloads for free digital files start immediately while downloads for purchased digital files are done through link delivered via email.

Royalty system
Cadpick sellers get a flat rate 75% royalty of the price listed. Cadpick does not require seller artist to exclusively post their works on to the portal.

Founder
Cadpick was founded in 2013 in Nairobi, Kenya by Tiberius Mogaka, an Engineering Designer and 3D modeler. Cadpick was officially launched in February 2017 and is hosted in the United States.

Acquisition and closure
Cadpick.com was acquired by a private consortium in late 2019 that later turned out to be a hostile take-over as posted by sources intimate to the acquisition negotiations

References

Companies based in Nairobi
Online marketplaces of Kenya